Joseph Patrick Dougherty (January 11, 1905 – July 9, 1970) was an American prelate of the Roman Catholic Church. He served as the first bishop of the Diocese of Yakima in Washington State from 1951 to 1969 and as an auxiliary bishop of the Archdiocese of Los Angeles in California from 1969 to 1970.

Biography

Early life 
Joseph Dougherty was born on January 11, 1905, in Kansas City, Kansas.  He attended the University of Portland in Portland,  Oregon and St. Patrick Seminary in Menlo Park, California. 

Dougherty was ordained to the priesthood for the Diocese of Seattle on June 14, 1930. In 1930, he was appointed as a professor at St. Edward Seminary in Kenmore, Washington.  He left that position in 1934 to become vice-chancellor of the diocese.  In 1942, Dougherty became chancellor. He was also a diocesan consultor and director of the Society for the Propagation of the Faith.

Bishop of Yakima 
On July 9, 1951, Dougherty was appointed the first bishop of the newly erected Diocese of Yakima by Pope Pius XII. He received his episcopal consecration on September 26, 1951, from Archbishop Thomas Arthur Connolly, with Bishops Charles Daniel White and Hugh Aloysius Donohoe serving as co-consecrators. He attended all four sessions of the Second Vatican Council in Rome between 1962 and 1965.

Auxiliary Bishop of Los Angeles 
On February 5, 1969, Pope Paul VI named Dougherty as an auxiliary bishop of the Archdiocese of Los Angeles and Titular Bishop of Altinum.Joseph Dougherty died on July 9, 1970, at age 65.  He is buried at Calvary Cemetery in Yakima, Washington.

References

1905 births
1970 deaths
People from Kansas City, Kansas
Roman Catholic bishops of Yakima
American Roman Catholic clergy of Irish descent
20th-century Roman Catholic bishops in the United States
Participants in the Second Vatican Council
University of Portland alumni
Saint Patrick's Seminary and University alumni
Roman Catholic Archdiocese of Seattle
Religious leaders from Kansas
Catholics from Kansas